Ernest Ferdinand Ritz (5 March 1848 – 4 June 1890) was a Swedish-American photographer in Boston, Massachusetts during the 19th century.

Ritz was born in Stockholm. He came to the United States in November 1859, settling with his parents, Johanna and Oscar, in Boston. He became a citizen in 1876.

He learned photography working  for Abraham Bogardus in New York City. From 1865 lasted until 1884,  he worked in partnership with George F. Hastings (1852-1931) at the Ritz & Hastings photography studio, located on Temple Place in Boston. The studio devoted itself exclusively to portrait work. In 1881 Ritz & Hastings showed work at the Massachusetts Charitable Mechanic Association exhibit and in 1883 at the Professional Photographers of America conference in Milwaukee.

He died in Boston, aged 42.

Image gallery

References

External links

 Wisconsin Historical Society. Portrait of Alansen Kimball.
 University of Kansas. Verso of cabinet card by Ritz & Hastings

1848 births
1890 deaths
Artists from Stockholm
Artists from Boston
19th century in Boston
Swedish emigrants to the United States
19th-century American photographers
American portrait photographers
American Freemasons